The Ubol Ratana Dam (pronounced: Ubon Rat), formerly known as the "Phong Neeb Dam", is a multi-purpose dam in tambon Khok Sung, Ubolratana district, approximately  north of Khon Kaen, Khon Kaen province, Thailand.  It was the first hydroelectric power project developed in Thailand's northeastern area of Isan. The dam impounds the Nam Phong, which flows into the Chi River and thence to the Mun River, a tributary of the Mekong River.  The dam was given its current name by royal permission in 1966, in honour of princess Ubol Ratana, the eldest child of King Bhumibol Adulyadej.

Description

The dam is multi-purpose: electricity generation, irrigation, flood control, transportation, fisheries, and as tourist attraction. It is an earth core rockfill dam, constructed in 1964.

The dam is managed by the Electricity Generating Authority of Thailand (EGAT).

Thirty thousand people were resettled to make way for the large reservoir accompanying the dam. This resettlement resulted in a sharp decrease in forested areas in the catchment areas and an increase in erosion.

In 1984, the dam was modified to reinforce dam safety and to ensure better flood protection.

Power plant
The dam generates an average of  a year. The operation of the turbines commenced on 4 February 1966, 14 March 1969, and 12 June 1968 respectively.

History
In April 2016 the dam ran dry for the first time since its construction. With no usable storage it cannot provide irrigation water, cannot generate electricity, and its fish population is dying. Its usable storage stands at minus 3.95 percent (as of (2016-04-04).

Ubol Ratana Dam is the first of the royal dams to run dry. The other royal dams are:
Bhumibol Dam: opened in 1964 in the north on the Ping River. Capacity: 13,462,000,000 m3. 
Sirindhorn Dam: opened in 1971 in the northeast on the Lam Dom Noi River. Capacity: 1,966,000,000 m3
Chulabhorn Dam: opened in 1972 in the northeast on the Phrong River. Capacity: 165,000,000 m3
Sirikit Dam: opened in 1974 in the north on the Nan River. Capacity: 9,510,000,000 m3
Srinagarind Dam: opened in 1980 in the west on the Khwae Yai River. Capacity: 17,745,000,000 m3
Vajiralongkorn Dam: opened in 1984 in the west on the Khwae Noi River. Capacity: 8,100,000 m3

Due to the ongoing drought, the royal dams are heavily stressed. According to the Hydro and Agro Informatics Institute, as of 3 April 2016, sixteen Thai dams are at critically low levels of usable reservoir storage. Of the other royal dams, Bhumibol Dam is at four percent, Sirindhorn Dam is at 10 percent, Srinagarind Dam is at 11 percent, Sirikit Dam is at 12 percent, Chulabhorn Dam is at 13 percent, and Vajiralongkorn Dam is at 14 percent.

See also

 Mekong River Basin Hydropower
 Mekong River Commission
 Electricity Generating Authority of Thailand

References

External links

CGIAR Challenge Program on Water and Food-Mekong
Thailand National Mekong Committee
Electricity Generating Authority of Thailand
Mekong Program on Water, Environment and Resilience
Mekong River Commission

Dams in the Mekong River Basin
Dams in Thailand
Hydroelectric power stations in Thailand
Isan
Dams completed in 1966
Energy infrastructure completed in 1966
Buildings and structures in Khon Kaen province
1966 establishments in Thailand
Rock-filled dams